Tamara Vučković (born 1970), also known by her married name Tamara Vučković Manojlović, is a Serbian actress who is the current director of the Yugoslav Drama Theatre. She is the wife of fellow Serbian actor Miki Manojlović, with whom she has a son, Ivan.

Filmography

References

External links

1970 births
Living people
20th-century Serbian actresses
21st-century Serbian actresses
Actresses from Belgrade
Serbian film actresses
Serbian television actresses
Serbian theatre directors
Theatre people from Belgrade